Jawahar Navodaya Vidyalaya, Alappuzha or locally known as JNV Chennithala is a boarding, co-educational school in Alappuzha district of Kerala state in India. Navodaya Vidyalayas are funded by the Indian Ministry of Human Resources Development and administered  by Navodaya Vidyalaya Smiti, an autonomous body under the ministry. Previously the school name was JNV Alleppey before renaming of Alleppey district to Alappuzha district.

History 
The school was established in 1992, and is a part of Jawahar Navodaya Vidyalaya schools. This school's permanent campus is located at village Chennithala, Alappuzha district. This school is administered and monitored by Hyderabad regional office of Navodaya Vidyalaya Smiti.

Admission 
Admission to JNV Alappuzha at class VI level is made through selection test conducted by Navodaya Vidyalaya Smiti. The information about test is disseminated and advertised in the district by the office of Alappuzha district magistrate (Collector), who is also the chairperson of Vidyalya Management Committee.

Affiliations 
JNV Alappuzha is affiliated to Central Board of Secondary Education with affiliation number 940012, following the curriculum prescribed by CBSE.

See also 

 List of JNV schools

References

External links 

 Official Website of JNV Alappuzha

High schools and secondary schools in Kerala
Alappuzha
Educational institutions established in 1992
1992 establishments in Kerala
Alappuzha district